Piz Malmurainza (3,038 m) is a mountain of the Swiss Samnaun Alps, located north of Tschlin in the canton of Graubünden. It lies between the Muttler and Piz Mundin, on the range separating the main Inn valley from the Samnaun valley.

References

External links
 Piz Malmurainza on Hikr

Valsot
Mountains of the Alps
Mountains of Switzerland
Alpine three-thousanders
Mountains of Graubünden